Dolichoprosopus yokoyamai is a species of beetle in the family Cerambycidae. It was described by Gressitt in 1937. It is known from Japan. It feeds on Fagus crenata.

References

Lamiini
Beetles described in 1937